Allochromatium is a genus of bacteria in the family Chromatiaceae.

Species
 Allochromatium humboldtianum
 Allochromatium minutissimum
 Allochromatium phaeobacterium
 Allochromatium renukae
 Allochromatium vinosum
 Allochromatium warmingii

References

Chromatiales
Lithoautotrophs
Bacteria genera